Goodbye Youth (Italian: Addio giovinezza!) is a 1918 Italian silent drama film directed by Augusto Genina and starring Maria Jacobini, Lido Manetti and Helena Makowska, The film was adapted from the 1911 play of the same name by Nino Oxilia and Sandro Camasio, The film is set in Turin at the beginning of the twentieth century, where a student begins a romance with a seamstress, Dorina, however he is lured away by a sophisticated older woman to Dorina's distress. Genina remade the film in 1927, again as a silent. It was then remade as a sound film of the same title in 1940.

Cast
 Maria Jacobini  
 Lido Manetti
 Helena Makowska
 Ruggero Capodaglio
 Oreste Bilancia

References

Bibliography 
 Goble, Alan, The Complete Index to Literary Sources in Film, Walter de Gruyter, 1999,

External links 
 

1918 films
Italian drama films
Italian silent feature films
Films set in Turin
Italian films based on plays
1910s Italian-language films
Films directed by Augusto Genina
Italian black-and-white films
1918 drama films
Silent drama films